Huai'an railway station can refer to:

Huai'an railway station (Hebei)
Huai'an railway station (Jiangsu)

See also
Hui'an railway station